Heraema is a genus of moths of the family Noctuidae.

Species
 Heraema mandschurica (Graeser, 1890)

References
Natural History Museum Lepidoptera genus database
Heraema at funet

Hadeninae